Lymphia is a genus of snout moths. It was described by Rebel in 1901. It contains only one species, Lymphia chalybella, which is found in France and Russia.

References

Phycitini
Monotypic moth genera
Moths of Europe
Pyralidae genera